Jolette Guadalupe Hernández Navarrete (born 21 January 1984) is a Mexican singer and television presenter. She is best remembered for being part of the fourth generation from the reality musical talent show La Academia in 2005.

Early life 
Jolette has two brothers and one sister.

Career

La Academia (2005) 
Jolette formed part of the 2005 generation from the musical reality show La Academia. Although she did not demonstrate any vocal talent in the beginning of the show, she got to stay for 17 weeks on the show. She is best remembered on the show for her multiple clashes with judges, professors and fellow contestants, which caused the rating of the program to go up.

Cuídate de la Cámara (2016–present) 
Since 2016, Jolette has formed part of the fashion criticism program Cuídate de la Cámara. It has been claimed that she has suffered of multiple attacks by her co-workers in the program.

Bailando por un sueño (2017) 
In 2017 Jolette was selected to participate on the dancing reality show by Televisa Bailando por un sueño, where she was partnered with her "dreamer" Adrián Cavero. She was eliminated on the first program, and stated that she was only used by the production to generate more audience.

Discography 
 Mi Sueño En La Academia (2005)

References

External links 
 

1984 births
Living people
Mexican television presenters
Mexican women television presenters
People from Guadalajara, Jalisco
Singers from Guadalajara, Jalisco
21st-century Mexican singers